Buxus sinica, the Chinese box or small-leaved box, is a species of flowering plant in the family Buxaceae, native to central and southern China, Taiwan, South Korea, and Japan. There are a number of cultivars, all derived from Buxus sinica var.insularis (syn. Buxus koreana), including 'Winter Gem', 'Green Gem', 'Justin Brouwers', 'Wintergreen', 'Chegu', 'Tall Boy', 'Tide Hill', 'Winter Beauty', 'Green Mountain', 'Pincushion', 'Filigree', 'Green Velvet', and 'Sunnyside'. In addition to its use in hedging, it is used in bonsai.

Subtaxa
The following varieties are accepted:
Buxus sinica var. aemulans  – southern China
Buxus sinica var. insularis  – South Korea, Hiroshima Prefecture, Japan
Buxus sinica var. intermedia  – Taiwan
Buxus sinica var. parvifolia  – southern China
Buxus sinica var. pumila  – western Hubei
Buxus sinica var. sinica – central and southern China, introduced to Japan
Buxus sinica var. vacciniifolia  – southern China

References

sinica
Flora of North-Central China
Flora of South-Central China
Flora of Southeast China
Flora of Taiwan
Flora of South Korea
Flora of Japan
Plants used in bonsai
Plants described in 1980